"Mobility" is a song by American electronica musician Moby. It was released as his debut single by Instinct Records in November 1990.

"Go", the single's B-side, would later be remixed by Moby and released as his second single in 1991. Tracks from the single were also included on the compilations Instinct Dance (1991) and Early Underground (1993).

Track listing

References

External links 
 

1990 debut singles
1990 songs
Moby songs
Songs written by Moby